Elmedin Konaković (born 3 September 1974) is a Bosnian politician serving as Minister of Foreign Affairs since January 2023. He is the president of the People and Justice party and was previously a member of the Federal House of Representatives.

Konaković was also a member of the Federal House of Peoples. He served as Prime Minister of Sarajevo Canton from 2015 to 2018 as well.

Early life and education
Konaković was born in Sarajevo, SFR Yugoslavia, present-day Bosnia and Herzegovina in 1974. He graduated from Electrical Engineering secondary School and, after the Bosnian War, from the Faculty of Sports and Physical Education of the University of Sarajevo.

Early career
During the Bosnian War, Konaković joined the Army of the Republic of Bosnia and Herzegovina (10th Mountain Brigade and 15th Motorized Brigade) and played in Sarajevo's famous basketball club, KK Bosna. He continued his career in the late 1990s in Slovenia, Hungary and Romania. In 2002, Konaković became director of the Bosnia and Herzegovina men's national basketball team, and in 2003 director of KK Bosna, a position he held until 2007.

Political career
In 2004, Konaković joined the Party of Democratic Action (SDA) and was elected to the local council of the Centar municipality in Sarajevo. At the 2008 municipal elections, he ran for municipal mayor of Centar, but with no success. After the 2010 general election, he entered the Sarajevo Cantonal Assembly and became chair of the SDA MPs caucus.

On 23 March 2015, Konaković was appointed Prime Minister of Sarajevo Canton. He was removed from the post in March 2018, after he had decided to leave the SDA. Konaković then set up his own People and Justice party, and was elected speaker of the Sarajevo Cantonal Assembly after the 2018 general election, serving until January 2020. Meanwhile, in July 2019, he was appointed to the Federal House of Peoples.

Minister of Foreign Affairs (2023–present)

Appointment

On 25 January 2023, following the formation of a new Council of Ministers presided over by Borjana Krišto, Konaković was appointed as the new Minister of Foreign Affairs within Krišto's government.

Tenure

On 13 February 2023, Konaković spoke in a telephone call with United States Secretary of State Antony Blinken, expressing his gratitude for the United States’s "commitment to peace, security and stability of Bosnia and Herzegovina."

Konaković attended the 59th Munich Security Conference from 17 to 19 February, during which he met with a number of foreign officials from Spain, Sweden, Austria, France and the United Kingdom.

Personal life
Konaković is married to Al Jazeera Balkans journalist Dalija Hasanbegović, and together they have one child. He does not have real estate, while his wife owns several properties in Sarajevo as a heritage from the Merhemić family. He was previously married with models Aida Osmanović and Martina Saira Keškić, until 2014.

Besides his native Bosnian, Konaković speaks English fluently and is conversant in Italian and Romanian.

See also
List of current foreign ministers

References

External links

Elmedin Konaković at narodipravda.ba

1974 births
Living people
Politicians from Sarajevo
Bosniaks of Bosnia and Herzegovina
Bosnia and Herzegovina Muslims
Army of the Republic of Bosnia and Herzegovina soldiers
Academic staff of the University of Sarajevo
Bosniak politicians
Politicians of the Federation of Bosnia and Herzegovina
Party of Democratic Action politicians
People and Justice politicians
Foreign ministers of Bosnia and Herzegovina